Nagaradalli Nayakaru is an Indian comedy thriller film in the Kannada language and was first released in 1992. It was directed by Om Sai Prakash and written by the screenwriter duo Siddique-Lal. The film is about four guys trying to woo a girl, who moved to another city with her grandparents in order to find out who murdered her brother.

The film is a remake of the popular Malayalam film In Harihar Nagar (1990).

Cast
Malashri as Maya
Sunil as Ramu
Chi. Guru Dutt as Kaamu 
Balaraj as Bheemu 
Sudhakar as Dhamu 
Tara
Mukhyamantri Chandru
Jai Jagadish as Sharath
 Rambo Rocky as John Robert
 Rathasapthami Aravind 
 Sridhar as Anand 
 M.S.Umesh 
 sathyabhama 
 Ananthrao maccheri 
 Pailwaan Venu 
 K. D. Venkatesh 
 Rocket vikram
 Bank suresh
 Guru Murthy

Soundtrack

References

External links

1991 films
1990s Kannada-language films
Kannada remakes of Malayalam films
Indian crime comedy films
Films directed by Sai Prakash
Films scored by Raj–Koti